Liam O'Brien may refer to:

Liam O'Brien (born 1976), American voice actor and voice director
Liam O'Brien (Irish actor), Irish actor
Liam O'Brien (athlete) (born 1954), Irish Olympic athlete
Liam O'Brien (footballer, born 1964), Irish international football player
Liam O'Brien (footballer, born 1991), English football player
Liam O'Brien (hurler) (born 1950), former Irish hurler
Liam O'Brien (ice hockey) (born 1994), Canadian ice hockey player
Liam O'Brien (screenwriter) (1913–1996), American screenwriter and television producer

See also
Liam Ó Briain (1888–1974), Irish language expert and political activist